WBXT-LD was an Sonlife Broadcasting Network affiliate for Tallahassee, Florida. It was owned by L4 Media Group, and broadcast on digital UHF channel 43. It was also an affiliate of The Box until that network's acquisition by Viacom in 2001 and became an MTV2 affiliate soon after.

The station's license was cancelled by the Federal Communications Commission on May 15, 2019.

References

External links 

BXT-LD
BXT-LD